Art Company may refer to:
 The Art Company, a name sometimes used by Dutch band VOF de Kunst
 Ohio Art Company